The New Zealand catshark (Bythaelurus dawsoni) is a catshark of the family Scyliorhinidae in the order Carcharhiniformes. This species is endemic to in the deep waters around New Zealand. The New Zealand catshark is a small, little-known deep water bottom shark. It is dark brown around the top with a few widely spaced pale spots, and white below. It feeds on bottom-living crustaceans. It is also completely harmless to humans.

Conservation status 
The New Zealand Department of Conservation has classified the New Zealand catshark as "Not Threatened" but with the qualifier "Data Poor" under the New Zealand Threat Classification System. It is regarded as being at risk from bottom trawling.

References

Endemic marine fish of New Zealand
Taxa named by Stewart Springer
Fish described in 1971
Bythaelurus